Lập Thạch is a township and capital of Lập Thạch District, Vĩnh Phúc Province, Vietnam.

References

Populated places in Vĩnh Phúc province
District capitals in Vietnam
Townships in Vietnam